Shim Jung-sub (or  ; born 21 February 1991) is a South Korean long distance runner who specialises in the marathon. He competed in the men's marathon event at the 2016 Summer Olympics.

References

External links
 

1991 births
Living people
South Korean male long-distance runners
South Korean male marathon runners
Place of birth missing (living people)
Athletes (track and field) at the 2016 Summer Olympics
Olympic athletes of South Korea
Athletes (track and field) at the 2014 Asian Games
Asian Games competitors for South Korea
Olympic male marathon runners
Athletes (track and field) at the 2020 Summer Olympics
21st-century South Korean people